Angelo Alessandri (born 29 September 1969 in Reggio Emilia) is an Italian politician. He has been the leader of the Northern League Emilia and federal president of the Northern League (from 2005 to 2012).

He was elected to the Italian Chamber of Deputies in 2006 and 2008.

In 2012 he resigned from Northern League, in contrast to the "new course" undertaken by the Secretary Roberto Maroni.

On 18 December 2013 he presented the new I Change party, of which he became national president.

References

Living people
1969 births
Lega Nord politicians
People from Reggio Emilia
Deputies of Legislature XV of Italy
Deputies of Legislature XVI of Italy